UDP-GlcNAc:betaGal beta-1,3-N-acetylglucosaminyltransferase 3 is an enzyme that in humans is encoded by the B3GNT3 gene.

This gene encodes a member of the beta-1,3-N-acetylglucosaminyltransferase family. This enzyme is a type II transmembrane protein and contains a signal anchor that is not cleaved. It prefers the substrates of lacto-N-tetraose and lacto-N-neotetraose, and is involved in the biosynthesis of poly-N-acetyllactosamine chains and the biosynthesis of the backbone structure of dimeric sialyl Lewis a. It plays dominant roles in L-selectin ligand biosynthesis, lymphocyte homing and lymphocyte trafficking.

References

Further reading

External links